Pedro René Peralta Soto (born July 9, 1966), better known as Chichi Peralta, is a Dominican musician, songwriter, composer and producer.

His music is rich in fusion of Latin rhythms with elements of world music. He has combined the son music with jazz, merengue and pop, African rhythms, hip hop, rap, bachata, guaguancó, Brazilian rhythms, plena, salsa, vallenato, cumbia, symphonic textures, Arabic rhythms and exotic instruments from India and Japan, among others.

Biography
Chichi Peralta was born on July 9, 1966, in Santo Domingo, capital of the Dominican Republic. His musical career began at the age of four, when he built his first drum.

The first album Peralta released was Trópico Adentro, but it was released independently and only in the Dominican Republic. His first album released internationally was Pa' Otro La'o, on which all the tracks were self-edited and produced. In 2000, he released the album De Vuelta al Barrio, which won the Best Merengue Album at the 2001 Latin Grammy Awards and great critical acclaim. In 2005 he released yet another album, Más Que Suficiente, which was nominated for Best Contemporary Tropical Album at the 2006 Latin Grammys, and also won many other international prizes. In 2007, Peralta was declared the Dominican Republic's goodwill ambassador for his contributions to Dominican culture. In 2009, he released his latest album De Aquel Lao' del Río which was released independently, and features a mixture of Dominican music genres with elements of world music. The album's first single was "Amor Samurai", which is a mix between Dominican bachata and Japanese music.

He has also composed the score of the documentaries Orgullo de Mi Tierra Samaná, Orgullo de Mi Tierra Puerto Plata and Orgullo de Mi Tierra Barahona and Camino a Higüey.

Discography

Studio albums

Singles

Awards
Lo Nuestro Latin Music Awards, 1998 – Revelación del Año – Género Tropical (Breakthrough Artist of the Year – Tropical Genre)
Latin Grammy Awards, 2001 – Best Merengue Album (De Vuelta al Barrio)
Latin Grammy Awards, 2006 – Best Contemporary Tropical Album (Más que Suficiente)
Lo Nuestro Latin Music Awards, 2007 – Tropical Merengue Artist of the Year

References

https://www.youtube.com/watch?v=nAuz8wyX_W4

External links 
Official website (in Spanish and English)
Chichi Peralta biography and discography at World Music Central

1966 births
Living people
Dominican Republic musicians
Dominican-tambora players
Güira players
Merengue musicians
Percussionists